Craig Robert Howie (born 27 August 1994) is a Scottish professional golfer who plays on the European Tour. He won the 2021 Range Servant Challenge on the Challenge Tour.

Amateur career
Howie won the Scottish Boys Championship at Murcar Links in 2012. He led the Amateur Championship stroke-play qualifying at Carnoustie in 2015 and was a member of the Scottish team that won the European Amateur Team Championship in 2016. He was not selected for the 2017 Walker Cup team, being named the second reserve. Howie graduated from the University of Stirling with a sports studies degree.

Professional career
Howie turned professional at the start of 2018 and played on the Pro Golf Tour in his first year as a professional. He had a successful season, winning the Leipziger Golf Open in August, beating fellow-Scot Chris Robb in a playoff. During the season he was also runner-up three times, third once and had three other top-10 finishes. In the event before his win, he had lost a playoff to Ondřej Lieser in the Zell am See – Kaprun Open. He won the Order of Merit and gained a place on the Challenge Tour for 2019.

Howie was injured at the start of 2019 and had a poor season. He retained his place on the Challenge Tour with a good performance at the 2019 European Tour Qualifying School in November. He had a better season in 2020 including a fifth-place finish in the ISPS Handa UK Championship on the European Tour, after a final round of 65. In May 2021 he won the Range Servant Challenge on the Challenge Tour, finishing 7 strokes ahead of the runner-up, Marcus Helligkilde.

Amateur wins
2012 Scottish Boys Championship, Sir Henry Cooper Junior Masters
2013 Craigmillar Park Open
2016 Scottish Student Sport Championships
2017 Craigmillar Park Open

Source:

Professional wins (2)

Challenge Tour wins (1)

Pro Golf Tour wins (1)

Team appearances
Amateur
European Amateur Team Championship (representing Scotland): 2016 (winners), 2017
European Boys' Team Championship (representing Scotland): 2012

See also
2021 Challenge Tour graduates

References

External links

Scottish male golfers
European Tour golfers
People from Peebles
1994 births
Living people